The 1972-73 French Rugby Union Championship was contested by 64 teams divided in 8 pools.

The first four of each pool, were qualified for the knockout stages.

The Stadoceste won the champsionship beating Dax in the final.

It was the first title after World War II for Stadoceste.

Qualification round 
In bold the clubs qualified for the next round. The teams are listed according to the final ranking

Knockout stages

"Last 32" 
In bold the clubs qualified for the next round

"Last 16" 
In bold the clubs qualified for the next round

Quarter of finals 
In bold the clubs qualified for the next round

Semifinals

Final

External links
 Compte rendu finale de 1973 lnr.fr

1973
France 1973
Championship